Chivu Stoica (the family name being Chivu; 8 August 1908 – 18 February 1975) was a leading Romanian Communist politician, who served as 48th Prime Minister of Romania.

Early life
Stoica was born in Smeeni, Buzău County, the sixth child of a ploughman. At age 12 he left home, and started working as an apprentice at Căile Ferate Române, the state railway corporation. In 1921, he moved to Bucharest, where he worked as a boilermaker at the Vulcan, Lemaître, and Malaxa companies. There he met Gheorghe Vasilichi, who recruited him into the Communist Party (PCR).

Career

In spring 1931, Stoica started working for the Grivița Railway Yards, where he met Gheorghe Gheorghiu-Dej, Vasile Luca, and Constantin Doncea; together, they started organizing a strike. On 20 August 1934, he was sentenced to 15 years of prison for his role in the Grivița Strike of 1933. At Târgu Jiu prison, he was close to Gheorghiu-Dej, who may have wanted Stoica to be his successor as General Secretary.

He was a member of the Central Committee of the Romanian Workers' Party from 1945 to 1975, and a member of the Politburo. He was Prime Minister of Romania between 1955 and 1961 and as President of the State Council of Romania (de facto head of state) from 1965 until 1967.

In his later years, Stoica fell out of favour with Nicolae Ceaușescu and his wife Elena.

Death
His death, by a Holland & Holland hunting rifle bullet to the head, was ruled a suicide.

Family
His first wife was Ecaterina (b. Klein), and his second one was Maria (b. Manolescu), an engineer, with whom he had a daughter.

References

External links

 

Heads of state of Romania
Prime Ministers of Romania
Deputy Prime Ministers of Romania
State Council of Romania
Members of the Chamber of Deputies (Romania)
Romanian communists
Inmates of Târgu Jiu camp
People from Buzău County
Romanian politicians who committed suicide
Suicides by firearm in Romania
Boilermakers
1908 births
1975 suicides
Communism in Romania
Grand Crosses of the Order of the White Lion
1975 deaths